Gogunda is a town and tehsil headquarters of Gogunda Tehsil in Udaipur district, located about  in north-west from Udaipur city in the Indian state of Rajasthan. It is situated on a high mountain in Aravalli hills and is reached by crossing a difficult mountain pass.

History
Gogunda was the temporary capital of Mewar for some years, when Udai Singh shifted his base here and left Chittorgarh after Akbar besieged it. Udai Singh also died at Gogunda in 1572 and Maharana Pratap's Raj Tilak (coronation) was performed here.

It was near Gogunda that the Battle of Haldighati in 1576 was fought between the armies of Maharana Pratap and the Mughal Army under Raja Man Singh.

In past centuries and during British Raj, the village of Gogunda was the seat of a feudal estate administered by a family belonging to the Jhala clan of Rajputs. The estate was part of the princely state of Mewar, and the family was among the major landed barons of that principality. It comprised 75 villages, encompassing a population, in 1901, of 7,708 and revenue of Rs.24,000/-.

Rajtilak of Maharana Pratap was completed by Masaliya Rawal - Rajpurohit of Jhala Rajput.

Gogunda, which was formerly classified as a village based on population, was reclassified as a Census Town in the 2011 Census of India.

Demographics 
Gogunda is a Census Town as per the 2011 census with a population of 8,751, of which 4,483 are male (51%) and 4,268 are female (49%). Gogunda has the highest percentage of scheduled castes population (19.53%) to the total population among all towns/cities of Udaipur district.

The literacy rate in the town of Gogunda is 42.52%. Its male literacy rate of 56.07% is the lowest among towns in the Udaipur district. Most people of Gogunda are Hindus. There is a significant population of Jains. Muslims are also living in Gogunda. Many Jain families are migrated to Surat, Mumbai and Udaipur for business.

Temples
Gogunda abounds with Hindu and Jain temples. Gogunda is a tehsil headquarter. It has 3 Jain temples. There is also a Shiva temple, a Charbhuja temple and a Hanuman temple. The Jain temples of Gogunda are nearly 600 years old. There is a 1000 years old Jain temple in nearby village Majawri. In 2018 a massive Pratistha mahotsav of Parshwanath temple was organised. There is also a mosque. Gogunda has many historical monuments like Rajtilak sthal of Maharana pratap, canopy of  Maharana Udai Singh and a massive palace of former jagirdar, which is now converted into a luxury hotel. There is a famous temple of Lord Ganesha. Gogunda is famous for its cultural heritage. Gangaur festival of Gogunda is very famous in tribals. Garasiya and Bhil tribal people came across the district for Gangaur fair. Famous Jain saint Pushkar muni ji maharaj born in a nearby village Semtal. There is a college and a dharmshala in the memory of Pushkar muni ji. He was a Paliwal Brahmin.

Tourist attraction 
Gogunda Palace (Rawla) was built in 1567 during Mewar rules experienced many historical fights. In the year 2017 this property is developed as a heritage hotel with rooms, suites, dining hall. The entire ambience of the palace is royal in nature. The highlights of the property are the rooftop seating arrangements and the lush gardens within the palace. This property is now open for domestic as well as international visitors.  One visiting Udaipur should really experience this serene property, which is approximately 36 km drive from the city.

Connectivity
Gogunda is located on NH 27  four-lane highway which connects Kandla port in Gujarat to Shivpuri, MP. It is well connected with Jodhpur, Udaipur and Jaipur. Nearest airport is Maharana Pratap international airport, Udaipur, which is also located on NH 27. The nearest railway station is Udaipur city railway station. Falna and Sirohi road railway stations are also nearby. Tourist places such as Ranakpur, Mt. Abu, Haldighati and Kumbhalgarh are nearby. Gogunda has rich natural scenery.

References

Cities and towns in Udaipur district
Former capital cities in India